James Barron (September 15, 1768 – April 21, 1851) was an officer in the United States Navy. As commander of the frigate , he was involved in the Chesapeake–Leopard affair in 1807 which led to the surrender of his ship to the British and resulted in him being court-martialed for his actions during the incident. After criticism from some fellow officers, the resulting controversy led Barron to a duel with Stephen Decatur, one of the officers who presided over his court-martial. Suspended from command, he pursued commercial interests in Europe during the War of 1812. Barron finished his naval career on shore duty, becoming the Navy's senior officer in 1839.

Early life

Barron was born in Hampton, Virginia, the son of a merchant captain named James Barron who became Commodore of the tiny Virginia State Navy during the American Revolution. He was a younger brother of Samuel Barron. As a boy, Barron served as an apprentice in with his father for several years and entered the navy as a lieutenant and served aboard United States under John Barry. For his exceptional ability and service Barron was promoted to captain in 1799.

Military career

On March 9, 1798, he was commissioned as a lieutenant in the newly created United States Navy. Barron demonstrated superior seamanship abilities as an officer of the frigate . Two years later, he was promoted to captain and commanded the sloop-of-war  during the final months of the Quasi-War with France.

Early in 1804 Barron supervised the building of gunboats at Hampton, Virginia. Because of health problems he relinquished command of the squadron to Commodore John Rodgers.

On June 25, 1805, Barron, along with Stephen Decatur and others, presided over the court of inquiry, held aboard  at Syracuse, which looked into William Bainbridge's grounding and loss of  near Tripoli's harbor.

On April 15, 1806 he was appointed to the command of the Mediterranean Squadron. Barron obtained the rank of commodore on April 22 and was assigned command of  the following year. Chesapeake was berthed at Norfolk and was outfitted for her upcoming mission in great haste with a green crew and equipment that was below standards.

Barron commanded the frigate Chesapeake as a commodore. On June 22, 1807, his ship was involved in the Chesapeake–Leopard affair, an engagement that resulted in the defeat and capture of Barron's ship, one in a long line of such British incursions. The British ship of the line  hailed his frigate outside of Hampton Roads and asked to search for British Navy deserters. Barron refused. Leopard then opened fire on Chesapeake, killing three crewmen and wounding eighteen. Caught completely unprepared for battle, Barron surrendered. A British party boarded his ship and took away four alleged deserters.

In January 1808, a court-martial was held, and Barron was convicted of not preparing his ship in advance for possible action, and was suspended for five years without pay. John Rodgers was the president of the court-martial, and Stephen Decatur was a member.

Duel between Barron and Decatur

After being away for six years, Barron finally returned from Copenhagen seeking reinstatement, but he remained controversial and was criticized by some of his fellow officers. Commodore Stephen Decatur, a former subordinate, was one of the most vocal. Barron became embittered towards Decatur and challenged him to a duel with pistols, which they fought on March 22, 1820.

Barron's challenge to Decatur occurred during a period when duels between officers were so common that it was creating a shortage of experienced officers, forcing the War Department to threaten to discharge those who attempted to pursue the practice.

The duel was arranged by Bainbridge with Jesse Elliott in such a way that made the wounding or death of both duelists very likely. The duelists would be standing face to face in proximity to each other; there would be no back-to-back pacing away and turning to fire, the practice of which often resulted in the missing of one's opponent. After taking their places Barron and Decatur were instructed by Bainbridge, "I shall give the word quickly – 'Present, one, two, three' – You are neither to fire before the word 'one', nor after the word 'three'." Now in their positions, each duelist raised his pistol, cocked the flintlock and waited for the call where Bainbridge then called out, 'One', Decatur and Barron both firing before the count of 'two'. Decatur's shot hit Barron in the lower abdomen and ricocheted into his thigh. Barron's shot hit Decatur in the pelvic area, severing arteries. Both of the duelists fell almost at the same instant. Decatur, mortally wounded and clutching his side, exclaimed, "Oh, Lord, I am a dead man." Lying wounded, Commodore Barron proclaimed that the duel was carried out properly and honorably and told Decatur that he forgave him from the bottom of his heart. Decatur died from his wounds at approximately 10:30 pm that night while Barron survived his.

Later service
Barron remained in the Navy on shore duty, becoming the Navy's senior officer in 1839. He died in Norfolk, Virginia, on April 21, 1851. His personal papers, which primarily relate to the Chesapeake–Leopard affair, can be found in the Special Collections Research Center at the College of William & Mary.

See also
 Bibliography of early American naval history
 List of naval battles in the American Revolution
 List of single-ship actions
 Glossary of nautical terms (A-L)
 Glossary of nautical terms (M-Z)

Bibliography
  Url
  Url
  Url1 Url2
  Url
  Url
  Url
  Url
  Url
 Url

Notes

References

External links
 James Barron Biography
 James Barron, Naval Historical Center Biography
 
 
 

1769 births
1851 deaths
18th-century American naval officers
19th-century American naval officers
American military personnel of the Quasi-War
United States Navy personnel of the War of 1812
American duellists
United States Navy personnel who were court-martialed
People from Hampton, Virginia
Virginia colonial people